A three-part referendum was held in Poland on 6 September 2015. Voters were asked whether they approved of introducing single-member constituencies for Sejm elections, maintaining state financing of political parties and introducing a presumption in favour of the taxpayer in disputes over the tax law.

The voter turnout of 7.80 percent was well below the 50-percent threshold required for the referendum results to be legally binding.

Background
The referendums were ordered by President Bronisław Komorowski, who had promised to hold a referendum on the electoral system after the first round of the presidential elections, Although he had been leading in the polls, Komorowski received fewer votes (33.77%) than his main opponent Andrzej Duda (34.76%) in the first round. However third-placed candidate Paweł Kukiz received 20.8% of the vote, campaigning on introducing single-member constituencies for Sejm elections. A day after the May elections, Komorowski made an instantaneous decision to hold the referendum. Justifying his initiative, he explained that he saw high support for Kukiz as a signal that voters wanted changes.

Questions
The referendum asked voters the following three yes-or-no questions:
 Are you in favour of introducing single-member constituencies in elections to the Sejm of the Republic of Poland?
 Are you in favour of maintaining the current method of financing of political parties from the national budget?
 Are you in favour of introducing a general rule of resolving doubts regarding the interpretation of taxation law in favour of the tax-payer?

Results

Notes

References

2015 elections in Poland
2015
2015 referendums
Electoral reform referendums
Electoral reform in Poland
September 2015 events in Europe